"Every Day of the Week" is a song performed by American contemporary R&B group Jade, issued as the second and final single from their second studio album, Mind, Body & Song (1994). The song is the group's last appearance to date on the Billboard Hot 100, peaking at #20 in 1994.

Critical reception
Steve Baltin from Cash Box wrote, "On their new single, they demonstrate the savvy to know not to mess with a good thing as they follow the straight road with a mid-tempo beat and pleasant harmonies."

Music video

The official music video for the song was directed by German director Marcus Nispel.

Charts

Weekly charts

Year-end-charts

References

External links
 
 

1994 songs
1994 singles
Giant Records (Warner) singles
Jade (American group) songs
Music videos directed by Marcus Nispel
Songs written by Antonina Armato